, is a tokusatsu superhero series that aired in 1977.  Created by Shotaro Ishinomori, this 32-episode series (which aired on TV Tokyo from 2/2/1977 to 9/28/1977), harkens back to tokusatsu superhero shows of the 1950s, but with a late-1970s twist. The series was first released on DVD in 2008.

Premise and plotlines

The star of the show is a private detective named Ken Hayakawa, played by veteran Hiroshi Miyauchi.  In the first episode, his best friend Goro Asuka is mysteriously killed.  Ken takes over his friend's gear that Asuka had invented: a suit and a flying vehicle, which he names the Zubat Suit and the Zubat Car.  He travels the land as a wandering hero, fighting evil and injustice while in the guise of Zubat, and also trying to find Asuka's killer.  Zubat's name is based on the sound effect "zubatto," which is the sound of something being hit right on target.

The series is unusual in the tonkusatsu genre as the title hero Zubat does not "henshin" (transform) like the other superheroes Ishinomori created. Ken Hayakawa normally dresses in black & red gringo cowboy attire, but he just puts on his red & black "Zubasuit" hidden in his guitar when deciding to face his enemies as Zubat.  His outfit looks no different from that of a Sentai hero:
A helmet with "Z"-themed features and an open/close visor and mouthpiece
A streamlined rubber jumpsuit with a white scarf (another Ishinomori trademark).

The villains are also unusual for the genre.  There are no monsters; rather, Zubat fights against a large criminal organization named Dakker and its mysterious leader, as well as other outlandishly-dressed criminals.  Many episodes of this series have a bizarre Japanese "wild west" style setting, perhaps to explain why justice is meted out by a traveling superhero rather than lawful authorities expected in a more populated and dense setting like Japanese big cities.

An episode would generally have a single head criminal, and a yojimbo ("bodyguard"), somehow terrorizing a group of people. Ken Hayakawa would happen upon this and meet the yojimbo, which would lead to a demonstration of the latter's quirky skill they've used to threaten people.  Ken Hayakawa would then defeat the villain and their gimmick.

Episode List

Cast
: 
: 
: 
: 
: 
:

Songs
Opening Theme

Lyrics: Shōtarō Ishinomori
Composition & Arrangement: Kensuke Kyō
Artist: Ichirou Mizuki

Ending Theme

Lyrics: Saburo Yatsude
Composition & Arrangement: Kensuke Kyō
Artist: Ichirou Mizuki

Kamen Rider 40th Anniversary film

This brief appearance saw the four heroes destroy the Kamen Rider Stronger villain, General Shadow.

Legacy
This series would also be parodied by Daicon Films (now Gainax) in 1982, in a series of short films starring the superhero Kaiketsu Noutenki (who also has the same alter-ego, Ken Hayakawa). Zubat's costume was also a basis for the video game superhero parody Viewtiful Joe.

References

External links
Episode 1 and other episodes, uploaded by the official Toei account
Kaiketsu Zubat English language fan page
Zubaken - Japanese language fan page
Zubat 
 

Shotaro Ishinomori
Toei tokusatsu
1977 Japanese television series debuts
1977 Japanese television series endings
Television series about revenge
Tokusatsu television series
TV Tokyo original programming